Jalysus spinosus is a species of stilt bug in the family Berytidae. It is found in Central America and North America.

References

Berytidae
Articles created by Qbugbot
Insects described in 1824